Marius Andrei Pătrănoiu (born 1 December 1993) is a Romanian footballer who plays for Muscelul Elite II Câmpulung in the Liga IV.

References

External links
 
 Andrei Pătrănoiu at frf-ajf.ro

1993 births
Living people
Sportspeople from Pitești
Romanian footballers
Association football forwards
Cypriot First Division players
Alki Larnaca FC players
CSA Steaua București footballers
Romanian expatriate footballers
Romanian expatriate sportspeople in Cyprus
Expatriate footballers in Cyprus